Mirificarma lentiginosella is a moth of the family Gelechiidae. It is found from most of Europe (except Ireland, Sweden, Finland, most of the Baltic region and part of the Balkan Peninsula) to the Ural Mountains and Turkey.

The wingspan is 6.5-8.5 mm for males and 6–8 mm for females. The head is mid to dark brown. The forewings are dark brown with scattered pinkish buff scales. Adults are on wing from June to August.

The larvae feed on Genista tinctoria, Genista anglica, Genista germanica, Genista sagittalis and Laburnum anagyroides. They spin together the young terminal shoots of the hostplant. Larvae can be found in May and June. Pupation takes place in a cocoon amongst leaves on the ground.

References

Moths described in 1839
Mirificarma
Moths of Europe
Moths of Asia